Yasmin Omar, also known as Yasmin Hossam al-Din, is an Egyptian human rights lawyer. Born in 1988 in Saudi Arabia, she is known for her dedication to promoting and protecting the rights of marginalized communities.

Early life and career 
Omar earned her Bachelor of Law degree from Beni Suef University, Faculty of Law, Beni Suef. During her study years, she was part of a political activist group that start to work against human rights abuses and torture. She was arrested once. In a 2015 interview, Yasmin said:Those working in the judiciary and the lawyers in my family all wanted me to join them when I graduated. After my arrest, I realized I needed to be in a place where I could help people and not have my work be politicized despite my views. After graduation Yasmin practice human rights law under the supervision of prominent lawyer Ahmed Seif, and worked with Khalid ali on several cases.

In 2016, one of Yasmin's former clients, Mahmoud Shafiq Mohamed Mostafa, was accused by President Abdel Fattah al-Sisi of bombing the Botroseya Church using an explosive belt.

Yasminn, who represented Mostafa during his trial in 2014, said he happened to be in the vicinity of a Muslim Brotherhood protest in Fayoum when he was arrested and subsequently charged with protesting without a permit, arms possession and joining a banned group. Yasmin claimed that her client had been arbitrarily arrested near a protest in Fayoum and was subsequently tortured into giving a forced confession of illegally possessing weapons, which was broadcast on national television where he appeared with visible torture signs on his face. He was then taken to Demo Prison—a facility for adults—despite my constant requests at the time to move him to a juvenile facility. He was kept there in pretrial detention for a year. She criticized announcing the name of the suspect by the president before the prosecution could conclude its findings—something that could jeopardize the integrity of the investigation and its independence. 

Her public criticizing of the president lead to media defaming campaign against her from the pro-regime media outlets, and online harassing and several threats.

International work 
In 2007, Yasmin won the Open Society Foundation “CSLA” Civil Society Leadership Award. She moved to New York, USA to complete her LLM, Master of Laws, at Syracuse University College of Law in 2018. Her thesis, "Refugee Law and Policies in Egypt: The Gap Between Ratified Laws and Practice in Refugees Protection", was advised by Professor Cori Zoli.

After graduation, Yasmin joined The Tahrir Institute for Middle East Policy. Washington DC, where she worked from 2018 to 2021; she then worked with CFJ as UN and Regional Mechanisms Manager from 2022. During COP27, Yasmin built  the human rights collation, an African and Arab-led, broad Coalition of groups with the key aim of centering climate justice and the voices of the most impacted, especially from the Global South, at COP27. To do this, the Coalition will support civil society advocacy and actions leading up to and during the COP, and build movement solidarity across Africa and the Arab World to increase the strength of the movements. Coalition members include movements, networks, NGOs, trade unions, grassroots community campaigns, faith groups, youth activists and many others. They circulated a petition calling for the release of political prisoners.

References 

Egyptian human rights activists
Egyptian lawyers
1988 births
Living people